The Plague is a novel by Albert Camus. Published in 1947, it tells the story from the point of view of a narrator  of a plague sweeping the French Algerian city of Oran. The narrator remains unknown until the start of the last chapter, chapter 5 of part 5. The novel presents a snapshot of life in Oran as seen through the author's distinctive absurdist point of view.

Camus used as source material the cholera epidemic that killed a large proportion of Oran's population in 1849, but situated the novel in the 1940s. Oran and its surroundings were struck by disease several times before Camus published his novel. According to an academic study, Oran was decimated by the bubonic plague in 1556 and 1678, but all later outbreaks (in 1921: 185 cases; 1931: 76 cases; and 1944: 95 cases) were very far from the scale of the epidemic described in the novel.

The Plague is considered an existentialist classic despite Camus' objection to the label. The novel stresses the powerlessness of the individual characters to affect their destinies. The narrative tone is similar to Kafka's, especially in The Trial, whose individual sentences potentially have multiple meanings; the material often pointedly resonating as stark allegory of phenomenal consciousness and the human condition.

Major characters
Dr. Bernard Rieux: Dr. Bernard Rieux is described as a man about age 35, of moderate height, dark-skinned, with close-cropped black hair. At the beginning of the novel, Rieux's wife, who has been ill for a year, leaves for a sanatorium. It is Rieux who treats the first victim of plague and first uses the word plague to describe the disease. He urges the authorities to take action to stop the spread of the epidemic. However, at first, along with everyone else, the danger the town faces seems unreal to him. He feels uneasy but does not realise the gravity of the situation. Within a short while, he grasps what is at stake and warns the authorities that unless steps are taken immediately, the epidemic could kill off half the town's population of two hundred thousand within a couple of months.During the epidemic, Rieux heads an auxiliary hospital and works long hours treating the victims. He injects serum and lances the abscesses, but there is little more that he can do, and his duties weigh heavily upon him. He never gets home until late, and he has to distance himself from the natural pity that he feels for the victims; otherwise, he would not be able to go on. It is especially hard for him when he visits a victim in the person's home because he knows that he must immediately call for an ambulance and have the person removed from the house. Often, the relatives plead with him not to do so since they know they may never see the person again.Rieux works to combat the plague simply because he is a doctor and his job is to relieve human suffering. He does not do it for any grand, religious purpose, like Paneloux (Rieux does not believe in God), or as part of a high-minded moral code, like Tarrou. He is a practical man, doing what needs to be done without any fuss, but he knows that the struggle against death is something that he can never win.
Jean Tarrou: Jean Tarrou arrived in Oran some weeks before the plague broke out for unknown reasons. He is not there on business since he appears to have private means. Tarrou is a good-natured man who smiles a lot. Before the plague came, he liked to associate with the Spanish dancers and musicians in the city. He also keeps a diary, full of his observations of life in Oran, which the Narrator incorporates into the narrative.It is Tarrou who first comes up with the idea of organising teams of volunteers to fight the plague. He wants to do so before the authorities begin to conscript people, and he does not like the official plan to get prisoners to do the work. He takes action, prompted by his own code of morals; he feels that the plague is everybody's responsibility and that everyone should do their duty. What interests him, he tells Rieux, is how to become a saint even though he does not believe in God.Later in the novel, Tarrou tells Rieux, with whom he has become friends, the story of his life. His father, although a kind man in private, was also an aggressive prosecuting attorney who tried death penalty cases, arguing strongly for the death penalty to be imposed. As a young boy, Tarrou attended one day of a criminal proceeding in which a man was on trial for his life. However, the idea of capital punishment disgusted him. After he left home before 18, his main interest in life was his opposition to the death penalty, which he regarded as state-sponsored murder. However, years of activism have left him disillusioned.When the plague epidemic is virtually over, Tarrou becomes one of its last victims but puts up a heroic struggle before dying.
Raymond Rambert: Raymond Rambert is a journalist who is visiting Oran to research a story on the standards of living in the Arab colony of Oran. When the plague strikes, he finds himself trapped in a city with which he feels he has no connection. He misses his girlfriend who is in Paris and uses all his ingenuity and resourcefulness to persuade the city bureaucracy to allow him to leave. When that fails, he contacts smugglers, who agree to help him escape for a fee of ten thousand francs. However, there is a hitch in the arrangements, and by the time another escape plan is arranged, Rambert has changed his mind. He decides to stay in the city and continue to help fight the plague, saying that he would feel ashamed of himself if he pursued a merely private happiness. He now feels that he belongs in Oran, and that the plague is everyone's business, including his.
Joseph Grand: Joseph Grand is a fifty-year-old clerk for the city government. He is tall and thin. Poorly paid, he lives an austere life, but he is capable of deep affection. In his spare time, Grand polishes up his Latin, and he is also writing a book, but he is such a perfectionist that he continually rewrites the first sentence and can get no further. One of his problems in life is that he can rarely find the correct words to express what he means. Grand tells Rieux that he married while still in his teens, but overwork and poverty took their toll (Grand did not receive the career advancement that he had been promised), and his wife Jeanne left him. He tried but failed to write a letter to her, and he still grieves for his loss.Grand is a neighbor of Cottard, and it is he who calls Rieux for help, when Cottard tries to commit suicide. When the plague takes a grip on the town, Grand joins the team of volunteers, acting as general secretary, recording all the statistics. Rieux regards him as "the true embodiment of the quiet courage that inspired the sanitary groups." Grand catches the plague himself and asks Rieux to burn his manuscript, but then makes an unexpected recovery. At the end of the novel, Grand says he is much happier; he has written to Jeanne and made a fresh start on his book.
Cottard: Cottard lives in the same building as Grand. He does not appear to have a job and is described as having private means although he describes himself as "a traveling salesman in wines and spirits." Cottard is an eccentric figure, silent and secretive, who tries to hang himself in his room. He is anxious for Rieux not to report the incident, as he is under investigation by the authorities for an unstated crime. In an offhand reference to the plot of The Outsider, Cottard reacts by a sudden exit from the tobacconist shop when she mentions an arrest in Algiers of a man for killing an Arab on a beach. Cottard's personality changes after the outbreak of plague. Whereas he was aloof and mistrustful before, he now becomes agreeable and tries hard to make friends. He appears to relish the coming of the plague, and Tarrou thinks it is because he finds it easier to live with his own fears now that everyone else is in a state of fear, too. Cottard also avoids arrest by the police during the chaos caused by the plague. Cottard takes advantage of the crisis to make money by selling contraband cigarettes and inferior liquor.As the quarantine of the city comes to an end, Cottard anticipates being arrested after life returns to normal. He experiences severe mood swings; sometimes he is sociable, but at other times, he shuts himself up in his room. On the day the city gates are reopened, he shoots at random at people on the street, wounding some and killing a dog. The police arrest him.
Father Paneloux: Father Paneloux is a learned, well-respected Jesuit priest. He is well known for having given a series of lectures in which he championed a pure form of Christian doctrine and chastised his audience about their laxity. During the first stage of the plague outbreak, Paneloux preaches a sermon at the cathedral. He has a powerful way of speaking, and he insists to the congregation that the plague is a scourge sent by God to those who have hardened their hearts against Him. However, Paneloux also claims that God is present to offer succor and hope. Later, Paneloux attends at the bedside of Othon's stricken son and prays that the boy may be spared. After the boy's death, Paneloux tells Rieux that although the death of an innocent child in a world ruled by a loving God cannot be rationally explained, it should nonetheless be accepted. Paneloux joins the team of volunteer workers and preaches another sermon saying that the death of the innocent child is a test of faith. Since God willed the child's death, so the Christian should will it, too. A few days after preaching this sermon, Paneloux is taken ill. He refuses to call for a doctor, trusting in God alone, and dies. Since his symptoms did not seem to resemble those of the plague, Rieux records his death as a "doubtful case."

Minor characters

The Narrator: the narrator presents himself at the outset of the book as witness to the events and privy to documents, but does not identify himself until the ending of the novel.
The Prefect: The Prefect believes at first that the talk of plague is a false alarm, but on the advice of his medical association, he authorizes limited measures to combat it. When they do not work, he tries to avoid responsibility, saying he will ask the government for orders. Then, he takes responsibility for tightening up the regulations relating to the plague and issues the order to close the town.
Dr. Castel: Dr. Castel is one of Rieux's medical colleagues and is much older than Rieux. He realizes after the first few cases that the disease is bubonic plague and is aware of the seriousness of the situation. He works hard to make an antiplague serum, but as the epidemic continues, he shows increasing signs of wear and tear.
M. Othon: M. Othon is a magistrate in Oran. He is tall and thin and, as Tarrou observes in his journal, "his small, beady eyes, narrow nose, and hard, straight mouth make him look like a well-brought-up owl." Othon treats his wife and children unkindly, but after his son dies of the plague, his character softens. After he finishes his time at the isolation camp, where he is sent because his son is infected, he wants to return there because it would make him feel closer to his lost son. However, before Othon can do this, he contracts the plague and dies.
Jacques Othon: Philippe Othon is M. Othon's young son. When he contracts the plague, he is the first to receive Dr. Castel's antiplague serum. But the serum is ineffective, and the boy dies after a long and painful struggle.
Mme. Rieux: Mme. Rieux is Dr. Rieux's mother, who comes to stay with him when his sick wife goes to the sanatorium. She is a serene woman who, after taking care of the housework, sits quietly in a chair. She says that at her age, there is nothing much left to fear.
Dr. Richard: Dr. Richard is chairman of the Oran Medical Association. He is slow to recommend any action to combat the plague for fear of public alarm. He does not want even to admit that the disease is the plague, referring instead to a "special type of fever."
M. Michel: M. Michel is the concierge of the building in which Rieux lives. An old man, he is the first victim of the plague.
Raoul: Raoul is the man who agrees, for a fee of ten thousand francs, to arrange for Rambert to escape. He introduces Rambert to Gonzales.
Gonzales: Gonzales is the smuggler who makes the arrangements for Rambert's escape and bonds with him over football.
Asthma Patient: the asthma patient receives regular visits from Dr. Rieux. He is a seventy-five-year-old Spaniard with a rugged face, who comments on events in Oran that he hears about on the radio and in the newspapers. He sits in his bed all day and measures the passing of time by putting peas from one jug into another.
Louis: Louis is one of the sentries who take part in the plan for Rambert to escape.
Marcel: Marcel, Louis's brother, is also a sentry who is part of the escape plan for Rambert.
Garcia: Garcia is a man who knows the group of smugglers in Oran. He introduces Rambert to Raoul.

Plot summary
The book begins with an epigraph quoting Daniel Defoe, author of A Journal of the Plague Year.

Part one

In the town of Oran, thousands of rats, initially unnoticed by the populace, begin to die in the streets. Hysteria develops soon afterward, causing the local newspapers to report the incident. Authorities responding to public pressure order the collection and cremation of the rats, unaware that the collection itself was the catalyst for the spread of the bubonic plague.

The main character, Dr. Bernard Rieux, lives comfortably in an apartment building when strangely the building's concierge, M. Michel, a confidante, dies from a fever. Dr. Rieux consults his colleague, Dr. Castel, about the illness until they come to the conclusion that a plague is sweeping the town. They both approach fellow doctors and town authorities about their theory but are eventually dismissed on the basis of one death. However, as more deaths quickly ensue, it becomes apparent that there is an epidemic. Meanwhile, Rieux's wife has been sent to a sanatorium in another city, to be treated for an unrelated chronic illness.

Authorities, including the Prefect, are slow to accept that the situation is serious and quibble over the appropriate action to take.  Official notices enacting control measures are posted, but the language used is optimistic and downplays the seriousness of the situation. A "special ward" is opened at the hospital, but its 80 beds are filled within three days. As the death toll begins to rise, more desperate measures are taken. Homes are quarantined; corpses and burials are strictly supervised. A supply of plague serum finally arrives, but there is enough to treat only existing cases, and the country's emergency reserves are depleted. When the daily number of deaths jumps to 30, the town is sealed, and an outbreak of plague is officially declared.

Part two
The town is sealed off. The town gates are shut, rail travel is prohibited, and all mail service is suspended. The use of telephone lines is restricted only to "urgent" calls, leaving short telegrams as the only means of communicating with friends or family outside the town. The separation affects daily activity and depresses the spirit of the townspeople, who begin to feel isolated and introverted, and the plague begins to affect various characters.

One character, Raymond Rambert, devises a plan to escape the city to join his wife in Paris after city officials refused his request to leave.  He befriends some underground criminals so that they may smuggle him out of the city.  Another character, Father Paneloux, uses the plague as an opportunity to advance his stature in the town by suggesting that the plague was an act of God punishing the citizens' sinful nature. His diatribe falls on the ears of many citizens of the town, who turned to religion in droves, but would not have done so under normal circumstances. Cottard, a criminal remorseful enough to attempt suicide but fearful of being arrested, becomes wealthy as a major smuggler. Meanwhile, Jean Tarrou, a vacationer; Joseph Grand, a civil engineer; and Dr. Rieux, exhaustively treat patients in their homes and in the hospital.

Rambert informs Tarrou of his escape plan, but when Tarrou tells him that there are others in the city, including Dr. Rieux, who have loved ones outside the city whom they are not allowed to see, Rambert becomes sympathetic and offers to help Rieux fight the epidemic until he leaves town.

Part three
In mid-August, the situation continues to worsen. People try to escape the town, but some are shot by armed sentries. Violence and looting break out on a small scale, and the authorities respond by declaring martial law and imposing a curfew. Funerals are conducted with more speed, no ceremony and little concern for the feelings of the families of the deceased. The inhabitants passively endure their increasing feelings of exile and separation. Despondent, they waste away emotionally as well as physically.

Part four
In September and October, the town remains at the mercy of the plague. Rieux hears from the sanatorium that his wife's condition is worsening. He also hardens his heart regarding the plague victims so that he can continue to do his work. Cottard, on the other hand, seems to flourish during the plague because it gives him a sense of being connected to others, since everybody faces the same danger. Cottard and Tarrou attend a performance of Gluck's opera Orpheus and Eurydice, but the actor portraying Orpheus collapses with plague symptoms during the performance.

After extended negotiations with guards, Rambert finally has a chance to escape, but he decides to stay, saying that he would feel ashamed of himself if he left.

Towards the end of October, Castel's new antiplague serum is tried for the first time, but it cannot save the life of Othon's young son, who suffers greatly, as Paneloux, Rieux, and Tarrou tend to his bedside in horror.

Paneloux, who has joined the group of volunteers fighting the plague, gives a second sermon. He addresses the problem of an innocent child's suffering and says it is a test of a Christian's faith since it requires him either to deny everything or believe everything. He urges the congregation not to give up the struggle but to do everything possible to fight the plague.

A few days after the sermon, Paneloux is taken ill. His symptoms do not conform to those of the plague, but the disease still proves fatal.

Tarrou and Rambert visit one of the isolation camps, where they meet Othon. When Othon's period of quarantine ends, he chooses to stay in the camp as a volunteer because this will make him feel less separated from his dead son. Tarrou tells Rieux the story of his life and, to take their mind off the epidemic, the two men go swimming together in the sea. Grand catches the plague and instructs Rieux to burn all his papers. However, Grand makes an unexpected recovery, and deaths from the plague start to decline.

Part five
By late January the plague is in full retreat, and the townspeople begin to celebrate the imminent opening of the town gates. Othon, however, does not escape death from the disease. Cottard is distressed by the ending of the epidemic from which he has profited by shady dealings. Two government employees approach him, and he flees. Despite the epidemic's ending, Tarrou contracts the plague and dies after a heroic struggle. Rieux is later informed via telegram that his wife has also died.

In February, the town gates open and people are reunited with their loved ones from other cities. Rambert is reunited with his wife. Cottard goes mad and shoots at people from his home, and is soon arrested after a brief skirmish with the police. Grand begins working on his novel again. The narrator of the chronicle says that he  is Dr. Rieux and states that he tried to present an objective view of the events. He reflects on the epidemic and declares he wrote the chronicle "to simply say what we learn in the midst of plagues: there are more things to admire in men than to despise".

Critical analysis
Germaine Brée has characterised the struggle of the characters against the plague as "undramatic and stubborn", and in contrast to the ideology of "glorification of power" in the novels of André Malraux, whereas Camus' characters "are obscurely engaged in saving, not destroying, and this in the name of no ideology". Lulu Haroutunian has discussed Camus' own medical history, including a bout with tuberculosis, and how it informs the novel. Marina Warner notes its larger philosophical themes of "engagement", "paltriness and generosity", "small heroism and large cowardice", and "all kinds of profoundly humanist problems, such as love and goodness, happiness and mutual connection".

Thomas L Hanna and John Loose have separately discussed themes related to Christianity in the novel, with particular respect to Father Paneloux and Dr Rieux. Louis R Rossi briefly discusses the role of Tarrou in the novel, and the sense of philosophical guilt behind his character. Elwyn Sterling has analysed the role of Cottard and his final actions at the end of the novel. Father Paneloux has been subject to several literary analysis in the context of faith faced with great suffering.

Dr Rieux has been described as a classic example of an idealist doctor. He has also been an inspiration to the life and career of the French doctor , and also to the fictional character of Jeanne Dion, starring in the movie trilogy directed by Bernard Émond (beginning with The Novena).

Medically trained readers are sometimes upset that Dr. Rieux and Dr. Castel make no effort to get their patients sulfa drugs, which were available and known to be effective against plague.  Instead the doctors waste time and effort attempting to obtain plague antiserum, which was much less effective and, in fact, was rapidly being abandoned during the 1940s.

In the popular press
The novel has been read as an allegorical treatment of the French resistance to Nazi occupation during World War II.

The novel became a bestseller during the worldwide COVID-19 pandemic of 2020 to the point that its British publisher Penguin Classics reported struggling to keep up with demand. The prescience of the fictional cordon sanitaire of Oran with real-life COVID-19 lockdowns worldwide brought revived popular attention. Sales in Italy tripled and it became a top-ten bestseller during its nationwide lockdown. Penguin Classics' editorial director said "it couldn’t be more relevant to the current moment" and Camus' daughter Catherine said that the message of the novel had newfound relevance in that "we are not responsible for coronavirus but we can be responsible in the way we respond to it".

Adaptations
 1965: La Peste, a cantata composed by Roberto Gerhard
 1970 Yesterday, Today, Tomorrow, a Hong Kong film directed by Patrick Lung
 1992: La Peste, a film directed by Luis Puenzo
 2017: The Plague, a play adapted by Neil Bartlett.  Bartlett substitutes a black woman for the male doctor, Rieux, and a black man for Tarrou.
 2020: The Plague, an adaptation for radio of Neil Bartlett's 2017 play. Premiered on 26 July on BBC Radio 4 during the COVID-19 pandemic. The play was recorded at home by actors during the quarantine period. With Sara Powell as Doctor Rieux, Billy Postlethwaite as Raymond Rambert, Joe Alessi as Mr Cottard, Jude Aduwudike as Jean Tarrou and Colin Hurley as Mr Grand.

Publication history
As early as April 1941, Camus had been working on the novel, as evidenced in his diaries in which he wrote down a few ideas on "the redeeming plague". On 13 March 1942, he informed André Malraux that he was writing "a novel on the plague", adding  "Said like that it might sound strange, […] but this subject seems so natural to me."

 1947, La Peste (French), Paris: Gallimard
 1948, translated by Stuart Gilbert, London: Hamish Hamilton
 1960, translated by Stuart Gilbert, London: Penguin, 
 2001, translated by Robin Buss, London: Allen Lane, 
 2021, translated by Laura Marris, New York: Knopf,

See also

 The Decameron
 The Masque of the Red Death
 The Betrothed

References

External links
  La Peste, Les Classiques des sciences sociales; Word, PDF, RTF formats, public domain in Canada
  La Peste, ebooksgratuits.com; HTML format, public domain in Canada

1947 French novels
Absurdist fiction
Books with atheism-related themes
Éditions Gallimard books
Existentialist novels
French novels adapted into films
Novels by Albert Camus
Novels set in the 1940s
Novels set in Algeria
Plague (disease)
Oran
Health in Algeria
Novels about diseases and disorders
Novels about viral outbreaks
French novels adapted into plays
First-person narrative novels